Daniel B. Cid is a tech entrepreneur, open source developer and book author. Cid founded OSSEC, an open source intrusion detection system, in 2004 and led the project until it was acquired by Trend Micro (Third  Brigade) on June 16, 2008. He founded Sucuri in 2010, a web site security company, and served as its Chief Technology Officer until it was acquired by GoDaddy on Mar 22, 2017.

Cid wrote the Host-Based Intrusion Detection Guide book.

Cid is also the founder of CleanBrowsing, a DNS filter and was an advisor at AlienVault.

References

External links
 Daniel's blog

Living people
Chief technology officers of computer security companies
Free software programmers
Brazilian computer scientists
Year of birth missing (living people)